Gender Wars is a real-time tactics action game developed by The 8th Day and Sales Curve and published for DOS by GT Interactive and Sales Curve Interactive in 1996. A port for the PlayStation was in development but was cancelled.

Gameplay

The player controls a squad leader and any of their members, as they kill enemies, destroy enemy facilities, or retrieve devices. However, the player will have to control each member at a time, as they have difficulty navigating by themselves.

Plot

In the future, after an era of "Political Correctness and equality", humanity is divided into two hostile factions. Each faction represents one of humanity's two genders, the Males (who are ruled by a Patriarch) and the Females (who are ruled by a Matriarch), both of which behave in stereotypical manners (for instance, the Males being crude and focusing too much on drinking beer, the Females being easily distracted by fashion-related merchandise), and which may try to eliminate each other and capture each other's rulers. Either faction sometimes conducts raids against the other one to steal reproductive cells, in order to produce more members for themselves.

The player has to choose between the Male faction (who tries to capture the Matriarch) or the Female faction (who tries to capture the Patriarch). Regardless of the player's initial choice, the victorious faction of the two will put the remaining members of the defeated faction into servitude. The game ends by mentioning a rebellion caused by men and women working together, taking place a few years after the end of the Gender Wars.

Reception
GameSpot gave Gender Wars a "Fair" review score of 6.6/10, opining it is "a solid arcade strategy game that doesn't require lots of concentration, and has enough depth to keep things interesting. This basic premise, along with the game's original story line, good video and sound, and surprisingly good gameplay, make for a very engaging title." A retrospective by Richard Cobbett of PC Gamer called it "a rubbish Syndicate wannabe," one which still handles its subject "better than Rex Nebular and the Cosmic Gender Bender."

References

External links

1996 video games
Action video games
DOS games
DOS-only games
Feminist fiction
Real-time tactics video games
Science fiction video games
Single-player video games
Video games with isometric graphics
Video games scored by Nathan McCree
Video games developed in the United Kingdom
Video games featuring female protagonists
Video games set in the future